Bishi or Bi Shi may refer to:

Bishōnen, a modern aesthetic ideal of Asian origin or a beautiful young boy
Bishi Bhattacharya, a British musician and DJ
Al-Bishi, Arabic family name
Bishi, Hubei, town in Echeng District, Ezhou, Hubei, China
Bishi, Miluo, a town in Miluo City, Hunan province.
Bishi-ye Olya, village in Ilam Province, Iran